The UCL Slade School of Fine Art (informally The Slade) is the art school of University College London (UCL) and is based in London, England. It has been ranked as the UK's top art and design educational institution. The school is organised as a department of UCL's Faculty of Arts and Humanities.

History

The school traces its roots back to 1868 when lawyer and philanthropist Felix Slade (1788–1868) bequeathed funds to establish three Chairs in Fine Art, to be based at Oxford University, Cambridge University and University College London, where six studentships were endowed.

Distinguished past teachers include Henry Tonks, Wilson Steer, Randolph Schwabe, William Coldstream, Andrew Forge, Lucian Freud, Phyllida Barlow, John Hilliard, Bruce McLean, Alfred Gerrard. Edward Allington was Professor of Fine Art and Head of Graduate Sculpture until his death in 2017.

Two of its most important periods were immediately before, and immediately after, the turn of the twentieth century, described by Henry Tonks as its two 'crises of brilliance'. The first included the students Augustus John, William Orpen and Percy Wyndham Lewis; the second – which has been chronicled in David Boyd Haycock's A Crisis of Brilliance: Five Young British Artists and the Great War (Old Street Publishing, 2009) – included the students Dora Carrington, Mark Gertler, Paul Nash, C.R.W. Nevinson and Stanley Spencer.

Another cherished period followed the Second World War, under the directorship of William Coldstream, who brought in Lucian Freud to teach, and whose students included Paula Rego, Michael Andrews, and the filmmaker Lorenza Mazzetti. Coldstream was responsible for the creation of the Slade Film Department, the first in any British university, in 1960, with Thorold Dickinson as chief lecturer. Filmmakers associated with the Slade Film Department include Derek Jarman and Peter Whitehead.

Slade Centre for Electronic Media in Fine Art
The Slade Centre for Electronic Media in Fine Art (SCEMFA) was opened in 1995. The centre provides opportunities for research into electronic media and fine art with the goal of contributing to debate on national and international levels. The Slade had previously been home to Malcolm Hughes's Computer and Experimental Department in the 1970s.

In 1997 SCEMFA presented Collision, a public lecture series by artists, writers, and curators working with interactivity, telematics, and digital works. This exhibition was followed by Spontaneous Reaction, a week-long seminar funded by the Arts Council of England, which took a critical look at interactivity with participants from a variety of disciplines, including psychology, architecture, and computer science.

Throughout 1998, SCEMFA collaborated with Channel 4 UK to organise Cached, a monthly event held at the Institute of Contemporary Arts, London. Funded by the Arts Council, this series investigated the conceptual and practical issues of producing art for the internet through a series of artists presentations.

Art collection 
The Slade art collection was started when the yearly prizes awarded to top students was combined with a collection scheme in 1897 and the Summer Composition Prize and the Figure and Head Painting Prizes began to be kept by the school. Works by students and staff of the Slade School of Fine Art form the basis of the UCL Art museum today.

Rankings
In a 2008 survey conducted by The Sunday Times the Slade recorded perfect scores.

Teaching
The faculty currently offers the following programs:

Undergraduate studies
3-year BFA in Fine Art
4-year BA in Fine Art

Graduate studies
2-academic year (18 months) MFA in Fine Art
2-calendar (24 months) MA in Fine Art
1-term, 2-term, of 1-year Graduate Affiliate Study

Research
MPhil or PhD in Fine Art

Notable alumni

Full list see :Category:Alumni of the Slade School of Fine Art

Elinor Proby Adams (1885–1945), painter
Mary Adshead (1904–1995), mural painter, designer
Anna Airy (1882–1964), artist
Rosemary Allan (1911–2008), painter
Kathleen Allen (1906–1983), painter
Edward Allington (1951–2017), sculptor
Michael Andrews (1928–1995), painter
Irene Aronson (born 1918), painter and printmaker
Sue Arrowsmith (1950–2014), photographic artist
Ed Atkins (born 1982), artist
Ray Atkins (born 1937), painter
Joan Ayling (1907–1993), painter
Zainul Abedin (1914－1976), painter
Ethelwyn Baker (1899–1988), sculptor
Phyllis Barron (1890–1964), textile designer
Alvaro Barrington (born 1983), artist
James Bateman (1893–1959), painter
Amelia Bauerle (1873–1916), painter and illustrator
Pauline Baynes (1922–2008), illustrator
Tessa Beaver (1932–2018), painter and illustrator
Roy Beddington (1910–1995), painter, illustrator, and writer
Elinor Bellingham-Smith (1906–1988), painter
Eleanor Best (1875–1957), painter
Zelma Blakely (1921–1978), illustrator
David Bomberg (1890–1957), painter
Dorothy Elizabeth Bradford (1897–1986), painter 
Danielle Brathwaite-Shirley (born 1995), artist
Phyllis Bray (1911–1991), painter and muralist
Raymond Briggs (born 1934), illustrator, graphic novelist
Cecily Brown (born 1969), painter
Sheila Bownas (1925–2007), textile designer and botanical illustrator
Felicia Browne (1904–1936), painter and Spanish Civil War volunteer
Rodney Joseph Burn (1899–1984), painter
Dorothy Burroughes (1883–1963), illustrator
William Bustard (1894–1973), stained glass artist
Dorothy A. Cadman (fl. 1908–1927), painter
Martin John Callanan (born 1982), artist, current teaching staff
Gina Calleja (1928 – 2017), author and illustrator
Nancy Carline (1909–2004), artist
Sydney Carline (1888–1929), artist
Thomas Carr (1909–1999), artist
Ethel Carrick (1872–1951), painter
Dora Carrington (1893–1932), artist
Chien-Ying Chang (1913–2004), artist
Daphne Charlton (1909–1991), painter
Evan Charlton (1904–1984), painter
G. K. Chesterton (1874–1936), writer
Evelyn Cheston (1875–1929), painter
Spartacus Chetwynd (born 1973), artist, Turner Prize nominee
Derek Chittock (1922–1986), portrait painter
Dora Clarke (1895–1989), sculptor
Edna Clarke Hall (1879-1979), painter
Dorothy Coke (1897–1979), painter
Sir William Coldstream (1908–1987), painter
Professor Paul Coldwell (born 1952), artist
Ruth Collet (1909–2001), painter
John Collier (1850–1934), artist
Marian Collier (1859–1887), painter
Susan Alexis Collins (born 1964), artist, current Slade Director & Professor
Ithell Colquhoun (1906–1988), painter and writer
William George Constable (1887–1976), art historian
Teresa Copnall (1882–1972), painter
Matt Copson (born 1992), artist
Frank Barrington Craig (1902–1951), painter and teacher
Martin Creed (born 1968), artist
Dennis Creffield (1931–2018), painter
Barbara Crocker (1910–1995), artist, author
Claudia Cuesta, artist
Charles Cundall (1890–1971), painter
Nora Cundell (1889–1948), painter
Esmé Currey (1881–1973), painter, etcher
Yitzhak Danziger (1916–1977), sculptor
Tacita Dean (born 1965), 
Alison Debenham (1903–1967)
Evelyn De Morgan (1885–1919)
Angela Delevingne
Brigid Derham (1943–1980), painter 
Anthony Devas (1911–1958), portrait painter 
Sir William Dobell (1899–1970), portrait painter 
Barbara Dorf (1933–2016), painter
Sholto Johnstone Douglas (1871–1958), artist
Jane Dowling (1925–2023), painter
William Dring (1904–1990), portrait painter
William Easton, artist
Ursula Edgcumbe (1900–1985), sculptor
Ibrahim El-Salahi (born 1930), painter
Florence Engelbach (1872–1951), painter
Grace English (1891–1956), painter
Ben Enwonwu (1921–1994), artist
Jadé Fadojutimi (born 1993), artist
Leila Faithfull (1896–1994), painter
Julia Farrer (born 1950), artist
Robert Fawcett (1903–1967), illustrator
Daphne Fedarb (1912–1992), painter
Paul Feiler (1918–2013), artist
Elsie Few (1909–1980), artist
Philip Firsov (born 1985), artist and sculptor
Myrta Fisher (1917–1999), painter
Mary Sargant Florence (1857–1954), painter
Caroline Sylvia Gabriel (1912–1997), artist
Nicholas Garland (born 1935), political cartoonist
Raimi Gbadamosi (born 1965), neo-conceptual artist
Alfred Gerrard (1899–1998), sculptor
Kaff Gerrard (1894–1970), painter and potter
Mark Gertler (1891–1939), artist
A.A. Gill (1954–2016), journalist
Colin Gill (1892–1940), painter
Elsie Gledstanes (1893–1972), painter
Dryden Goodwin (born 1971), artist, current teaching staff
Douglas Gordon (born 1966), artist
Antony Gormley (born 1950), sculptor
Harold Gosney (born 1937), artist and sculptor
Caroline Gotch (1854–1945), painter
Carmen Gracia (born 1935), printmaker
Duncan Grant (1885–1978), painter and designer 
Eileen Gray (1898–1976), designer and architect
Barbara Greg (1900–1983), wood engraver
Gwenny Griffiths (1867–1953), portrait painter
Oona Grimes (born 1957), artist
Vaughan Grylls (born 1943), artist
Robin Guthrie (1902–1971), painter 
Kathleen Guthrie (1906–1981), painter
Edna Guy (1907–1982), marine artist 
Richard Hamilton (1922–2011), painter and collage artist
Archibald Standish Hartrick (1864–1950), artist and illustrator
Lucy Harwood (1893–1972), artist
Mona Hatoum (born 1952), artist
Francis Helps (1890–1972), artist
Elsie Henderson (1880–1967), painter and sculptor
Keith Henderson (1883–1982), artist and illustrator
Nigel Henderson (1917–1985), artist

Patrick Heron (1920–1999), abstract painter
Cicely Hey (1896–1980), painter and sculptor 
Ian Holbourn (1872–1935), artist, educator, laird of Foula, writer, and RMS Lusitania survivor
Ruth Hollingsworth (1880–1945), painter
Annie Horniman (1860–1937), theatre owner and manager
Nancy Horrocks (1900–1989), abstract artist
Ray Howard-Jones (1903–1996), artist
Edgar Hubert (1906–1985), painter
Georgina Hunt (1922–2012), abstract artist
Sidney Hunt (1896–1940), artist and designer
Paul Huson (born 1942), writer and designer
George Percy Jacomb-Hood (1857–1929), artist
Darsie Japp (1883–1973), artist
Derek Jarman (1942–1994), artist
Augustus John (1878–1961), artist
Gwen John (1876-1939), artist
Vivien John (1915–1994), artist
Arnrid Johnston (1895-1972), sculptor, illustrator
Alfred Garth Jones (1872–1955), illustrator
Karin Jonzen (1914–1998), sculptor
Gerry Judah (born 1951), artist and designer
Menashe Kadishman (1932–2015), Israeli sculptor and painter
Helen Kapp (1901–1978), artist and curator
Dorothy King (1907–1990), painter and curator
Eve Kirk (1900–1969), painter
Myfanwy Kitchin (1917–2002), painter, ceramicist
Robert Koenig (born 1951), sculptor
Clara Klinghoffer (1900–1970), artist 
Paul Kneale (born 1986), artist
Winifred Knights (1899–1947), painter
Kanayi Kunhiraman (born 1937), sculptor
Sir Osbert Lancaster (1908–1986), cartoonist
Olga Lehmann (1912–2001), painter, illustrator and designer
Maxwell Gordon Lightfoot (1886–1911), painter
Peter Kennard (born 1949), artist
Bernard Leach (1887–1879), ceramic artist, "Father of British studio pottery"
Edith Lawrence (1890–1973), artist
Kim Lim (1937–1997), sculptor
Zhi Lin, artist
Nicholas Logsdail (born 1945), art dealer
John Long (1964–2016), painter and teacher
Lowes Dalbiac Luard (1872–1944), painter
John Luke (1906–1975), painter and sculptor
John Lundberg (born 1968), artist and filmmaker
Sine MacKinnon (1901–1996), painter
Nicolette Macnamara (1911–1987), artist and author
John Mansbridge (1901–1981), painter and World War II official war artist
Constance Markievicz (1868–1927), artist, revolutionary nationalist, suffragette, socialist
Ellis Martin (1881–1977), map cover illustrator for Ordnance Survey
John Mascaro (born 1970), artist
Moina Mathers (1865–1928), artist and occultist
Mary McEvoy (1870–1941), painter
Dorothy Mead (1928–1975), painter
Robert Medley (1905–1994), painter and designer
Elizabeth Merriman (born 1963), painter
Oliver Messel (1904–1978), stage designer
Robert Micklewright (1923–2013), artist and illustrator
Mother Maribel of Wantage (1887–1970), artist and sculptor
Daniel Mulloy (born 1977), film writer and director
Donia Nachshen (1903–1987), illustrator
Paul Nash (1889–1946), painter
Gemma Nelson (born 1984), painter
C.R.W. Nevinson (1889–1946), artist
Bertha Newcombe (1857–1947), artist and illustrator
Ben Nicholson (1894–1982), abstract painter
Philip Norman (1842–1931), artist and antiquarian
Alanna O'Kelly (born 1955), Irish performance artist
Madge Oliver (1874–1924), painter
Sir Eduardo Paolozzi (1924–2005), artist
Kathleen Parbury (1901–1986), sculptor
Katie Paterson (born 1981), artist
Eddie Peake (born 1981), artist
Margot Perryman (born 1938), painter
Louise Pickard (1865–1928), painter
Edward Plunkett, 20th Baron of Dunsany (1939–2011), painter and sculptor
Mary Potter (1900–1981), painter
Sarah Pucill, film artist
Margaret Fisher Prout (1875–1963), painter
Carl Randall (born 1975), painter
Paula Rego (1935-2022), painter, illustrator and printmaker
Harold Riley (born 1934), artist
William Roberts (1895–1980), painter
Claude Rogers (1907–1979), artist
Rosemary Rutherford (1912–1972), painter and stained glass artist 
Ethel Jenner Rosenberg (1858–1930), first English Bahá'í 
Isaac Rosenberg (1890–1918), war poet
Paul Rotha (1907–1984), documentary film-maker, film historian and critic
Hiraki Sawa (born 1977), filmmaker and artist
James Scott (born 1941), filmmaker and artist
Melissa Scott-Miller (1959-), painter
Ina Maud Sheldon-Williams (1876–1956), painter
Rupert Shephard (1909–1992), artist
Edith Simon (1917–2003), artist, sculptor, author
Marianna Simnett (born 1986), artist
Veronica Smirnoff (born 1979), painter
Sir Matthew Smith (1879–1959), painter
Peter Snow (1927–2008), painter and theatre designer
Walter Shaw Sparrow (1862–1940), writer
Yolanda Sonnabend (1935–2015), theatre and ballet designer and painter
Sir Stanley Spencer (1891–1959), artist
Unity Spencer (1930–2017), artist
Andrew Stahl (born 1954), painter
Leo Steinberg (1920–2011), art historian
John Stezaker (born 1949), artist
David Storey (1933–2017), playwright, screenwriter, novelist
Keith Sutton (1934–2017), artist and critic
Ernest Heber Thompson (1891–1971), painter and printmaker
William Tillyer (born 1938), artist
Arthur Ralph Middleton Todd (1891–1966), portrait painter
Greta Tomlinson (1927–2021), artist
Euan Uglow (1932–2000), painter
David Vaughan (1944–2003), psychedelic artist
Charlotte Verity (born 1954), painter
Stelios Votsis (1929–2012), painter
Edward Wadsworth (1889–1949), artist
Mary Spencer Watson (1913–2006), sculptor
Edith Grace Wheatley (1888–1970), painter
Rex Whistler (1905–1944), painter, designer, and illustrator
Erica White (1904–1991), sculptor
Rachel Whiteread (born 1963), artist
Victor Willing (1928–1988), artist
Charli XCX (born 1992), singer–songwriter
Nan Youngman (1906–1995), painter and educationalist
Partou Zia (1958–2008), painter and writer
Cecilia Vicuña (born 1948), poet and artist
Christopher Le Brun (born 1951), artist
Anupam Sud (born 1944), Indian printmaker

In fiction
Pat Barker in Life Class and Toby's Room
Gilbert Cannan in Mendel
Frances Cary in Third Girl
Barbary Deniston in The World My Wilderness
Miranda Grey in The Collector
Imogen Hollins in Doctors
Molly MacDonald in Monarch of the Glen
David Thompson in Beyond This Horizon

See also
Art of the United Kingdom

References

External links

Slade Knowledge Base - extensive collection of studio teaching materials available online under Creative Commons
Slade Centre for Electronic Media in Fine Art
Slade Centre for Electronic Media in Fine Art Timeline of key events

 
Art schools in London
Education in the London Borough of Camden
Educational institutions established in 1871
Departments of University College London
1871 establishments in England